Thomas Herbert Lennox (August 7, 1869 – May 3, 1934) was an Ontario lawyer and political figure. He represented York North in  the Legislative Assembly of Ontario from 1905 to 1923 and in the House of Commons of Canada from 1926 to 1934 as a Conservative member.

He was born in Innisfil Township, Simcoe County, Ontario, the son of Thomas Lennox, an Irish immigrant, and was educated in Barrie and at Osgoode Hall. In 1894, he married Louise Meeking. He served three years on the town council and six years on the school board for Aurora. Lennox was also president of the Canadian Lacrosse Association. He was appointed a Patron of the Canadian Soccer Association, then known as the Dominion of Canada Football Association. He served as a lieutenant-colonel with the 208th Battalion, an Irish Canadian unit that he helped organize, during World War I. Lennox died in office in 1934.

In the 1925 federal election in York North, Lennox defeated Liberal Prime Minister William Lyon Mackenzie King. King was later elected in a by-election held in the Prince Albert riding in Saskatchewan.

References 
 Canadian Parliamentary Guide, 1915, EJ Chambers

External links 

A cyclopædia of Canadian biography : brief biographies of persons ..., HW Charlesworth (1919)

1869 births
1934 deaths
Conservative Party of Canada (1867–1942) MPs
Members of the House of Commons of Canada from Ontario
Progressive Conservative Party of Ontario MPPs